In the physical sciences and in telecommunication, the term frequency shift may refer to:

 Any change in frequency
 A Doppler shift
 In facsimile, a frequency modulation system where one frequency represents picture black and another frequency represents picture white
 Spectrum shifting in signal processing, see Discrete Fourier transform#Shift theorem

See also 
 Frequency mixer
 Voice inversion